Lakewood High School (commonly known as Lakewood or LHS) is a public secondary school in what was Arlington, but annexed to become an addition of Marysville, Washington, serving students in grades 9–12. The school is the only secondary school in the Lakewood School District, serving the Lake Goodwin, North Lakewood, and Smokey Point areas.

The original high school was built in 1983 and expanded in later years to accommodate a growing school population. A $66.8 million bond measure was passed in April 2014 to design and build a new high school on the same campus, with a capacity of 825 students. Construction began in May 2016. The new two-story,  building opened in September 2017 while demolition of the old building was still in progress.

Sports
The Lakewood Cougars compete in the 2A Northwest Conference. Sports offered: Baseball, Basketball, Cheer, Cross Country, Football, Golf, Soccer, Tennis, Track & Field, Volleyball, Wrestling.

Alumni 
Kataka Corn (2018), Actor and Musician

Controversy 
A member of the Everett-based Mariner High School girls varsity basketball team filed a complaint with the Lakewood School District, alleging that racist remarks were made by Lakewood spectators during a game on May 20, 2021, between Mariner and Lakewood. Simmons Sweeney Smith, a Bellingham-based law firm hired by the Mukilteo School District (which oversees Mariner) and the Lakewood School District as an independent investigator, found the complaints valid in a 25-page report submitted to the districts on June 9. The report also noted that the animosity spread to the court in the form of aggressive play due to the lack of intervening by the referees, with several Lakewood players injured during the game. With about four minutes left in the fourth quarter and his team trailing 35–38, Mariner coach Reggie Davis pulled his team from the court; their rematch, scheduled for the following week, was canceled.

The school district formed an Equity Team shortly after that to serve as the guiding force behind learning about equity in the school district and to assess student needs — socially, emotionally and academically. The Equity Team was guided by the Lakewood Compact, commitments articulated during a community process from 2019-2021.

References

External links

Lakewood High School
Lakewood School District (Washington)
Public high schools in Washington (state)
Arlington, Washington